Gang Related is a 1997 film.

Gang Related may also refer to:
 Gang Related (soundtrack), the soundtrack album for the film
 Gang Related (TV series), a 2014 Fox television series
"Gang Related", a song by Logic